Islam Awad (born 2 July 1987) is an Egyptian footballer who plays for Zamalek SC as a midfielder as well as Egypt national football team.

Honors
Zamalek SC
Egypt Cup (2): 2013, 2014

External links
 
 

1987 births
Living people
Association football midfielders
Egypt international footballers
Egyptian footballers